KEXS may refer to:

 KEXS (AM), a radio station (1090 AM) licensed to Excelsior Springs, Missouri, United States
 KEXS-FM, a radio station (106.1 FM) licensed to Ravenwood, Missouri, United States